The Truthful Sex is a 1926 American silent comedy-drama film directed by Richard Thomas and starring Mae Busch, Huntley Gordon and Ian Keith. A couple's successful relationship suffers strains following the birth of their first son.

Cast
 Mae Busch as Sally Carey Mapes 
 Huntley Gordon as Robert Mapes 
 Ian Keith as Tom Barnes 
 Leo White as Paul Gregg 
 Billy Kent Schaefer as Robert Mapes - Junior 
 John Roche
 Rosemary Theby as Jennie 
 Richard Travers
 Joan Meredith

References

Bibliography
 Munden, Kenneth White. The American Film Institute Catalog of Motion Pictures Produced in the United States, Part 1. University of California Press, 1997.

External links

1926 films
1926 comedy-drama films
American silent feature films
1920s English-language films
Columbia Pictures films
American black-and-white films
1920s American films
Silent American comedy-drama films